Bert Butler (11 April 1915 – 27 January 1999) was an Australian rules footballer who played for the Carlton Football Club in the Victorian Football League (VFL).

Notes

External links 

Bert Butler's profile at Blueseum

1915 births
1999 deaths
Carlton Football Club players
Australian rules footballers from Victoria (Australia)
Melton Football Club players